USS Noble (APA-218) was a  which saw service with the US Navy in World War II, the Korean War, and the Vietnam War. She was later transferred to the Spanish Navy in the 1964 under a mutual assistance agreement. Noble was named after Noble County, Indiana, Noble County, Ohio, and Noble County, Oklahoma.

Construction
Noble was laid down 20 July 1944, under Maritime Commission (MARCOM) contract, MCV hull 566, by Permanente Metals Corporation, Yard No. 2, Richmond, California; as a modified Victory ship; completed by the Kaiser Shipyard at Richmond; launched 18 October 1944; sponsored by Mrs. Maxine C. Jones; acquired by the Navy 27 November 1944; and commissioned the same day, Commander, later Rear Admiral, Solomon S. Isquith in command.

Operational history

World War II
Nobles primary mission was to transport to a combat area the men and some of the material necessary for an assault on an enemy shore. Her main armament, her boat group, was designed to deliver her troops and cargo to the beach in a planned and orderly fashion. After discharging troops and equipment, she could evacuate casualties or prisoners of war.

Invasion of Okinawa

In January 1945, Noble steamed westward to participate in the Okinawa campaign.

Post-war duties
Upon termination of the war, she assisted in the delivery of released allied prisoners of war from Korea to the Philippines. She also participated in Operation Magic Carpet, returning servicemen from the Pacific to the United States. Noble was attached to the US Atlantic Fleet from 1946 through 1949, operating out of Norfolk, Virginia.

Korean War
Noble returned to San Diego 13 September 1949, and was undergoing overhaul at Mare Island Naval Shipyard, San Francisco, when war broke out in Korea in June 1950. In August, she steamed to Korea to participate in the September Inchon amphibious assault. Thereafter, she assisted in the transport of US and foreign troops and equipment to and from the Korean combat zone.

In July 1953, she participated in Operation Big Switch, moving Communist North Korean prisoners from Koje Do to Inchon pursuant to the armistice agreement.

Peacetime operations
Subsequent to the Korean War, Noble conducted training operations in both the eastern and western Pacific areas. In 1955, she assisted in the evacuation of Chinese civilians and military from the Tachen Islands to Formosa. The ship appeared in the 1956 20th Century Fox movie D-Day the Sixth of June starring Robert Taylor, Richard Todd and Dana Wynter and in the 1956 movie Between Heaven and Hell starring Robert Wagner, Terry Moore, and Buddy Ebsen. At the outset of the Cuban Missile Crisis on 27 October 1962, Noble embarked 1,400 Marines with their equipment and steamed for the Caribbean in company with other Pacific Fleet amphibious units. She returned to San Diego in December, then deployed to WestPac in March 1963 for a tour with the Seventh Fleet Amphibious Ready Group.

Transfer to the Spanish Navy
Noble returned to San Diego in December 1963, and conducted upkeep and training operations until she decommissioned 1 July 1964. She then entered the Mare Island Naval Shipyard for preparation for transfer to Spain under the Mutual Assistance Program. The transfer ceremony took place 19 December, at San Francisco.

Spanish service
Renamed attack transport Aragón (TA-11), by the Spanish Navy, the ship served until being laid up and struck from the Spanish Navy Vessel Register on 1 January 1982. She was sold for scrap in 1987.

Notes 

Noble County, Indiana, was named for Noah Noble, an early governor of that state; Noble County, Ohio, was named for Warren P. Noble, an early settler, member of the Ohio House of Representatives and a US Representative from Ohio; and Noble County, Oklahoma, was named for John Willock Noble, Secretary of the Interior from 1889 to 1893.
Citations

Bibliography 

Online resources

External links

 

Haskell-class attack transports
Noble County, Indiana
Noble County, Ohio
Noble County, Oklahoma
World War II amphibious warfare vessels of the United States
Troop ships
Ships built in Richmond, California
1944 ships
United States Army units and formations in the Korean War